Ossaea incerta is a species of plant in the family Melastomataceae. It is endemic to Ecuador.

References

incerta
Endemic flora of Ecuador
Endangered plants
Taxonomy articles created by Polbot